The Dotsero Formation is a geologic formation in Colorado. It preserves fossils dating back to the Cambrian period.

See also

 List of fossiliferous stratigraphic units in Colorado
 Paleontology in Colorado

References
 

Cambrian Colorado
Cambrian southern paleotropical deposits